Wild cotton is a common name for several plants which may refer to:

 Wild forms of plants in the cotton genus, Gossypium
 Apocynum cannabinum, native to North America
 Asclepias syriaca, native to North America